"Cuts Both Ways" is a song by Cuban-American singer Gloria Estefan, released in 1990 worldwide as the fifth and final single from her debut solo album, Cuts Both Ways (1989). It had moderate success in the US, becoming a number one hit on the Billboard Adult Contemporary chart, while reaching number 44 on the Billboard Hot 100. The single, even with its success, was not included on the US release of the Gloria Estefan Greatest Hits album, but was included in The Essential Gloria Estefan and iTunes Originals: Gloria Estefan. A rerecorded version was also included on Estefan's 2020 album, Brazil305.

Critical reception
Matthew Hocter from Albumism described "Cuts Both Ways" as a "heartbreakingly beautiful song of love lost", and picked it as one of the "highlights" of the album of same name. Bill Coleman from Billboard viewed it as a "trademark-styled ballad, highlighted by lovely acoustic guitars and affecting vocals." David Giles from Music Week deemed it a "big ballad". He added, "Cliched lyrics aside; its acoustic guitar is undeniably pleasant and her voice is left attractively uncluttered, Carpenters style." A reviewer from The Network Forty noted that "shifting gears from power ballad to folk to Latin, this single has a deeper message, both musically and lyrically, than you might expect." Pop Rescue wrote that "this is really quite a nice track as it twists and turns", and "a nice plodder". Mike Soutar from Smash Hits called it a "latin-tinged sappy smoocher".

Music video
A music video was produced to promote the single, featuring Estefan performing alone in a beach house. Sometimes she is seen standing by a large window, glancing out at the sea. Other times she sits by a table. In between there are also small clips of billowing water or a guitar that is being strummed. The video was later published on Estefan's official YouTube channel in March 2011. It has amassed more than 2,7 million views as of October 2021.

Charts

Weekly charts

Year-end charts

Release history

Track listings

References

1989 songs
1990 singles
Gloria Estefan songs
Pop ballads
Songs written by Gloria Estefan
Epic Records singles